William Harper Jr. was a pioneer aviator and aviation engineer with the Wright brothers.

Biography
In 1912 he built his own airplane to fly out of Roosevelt Field, New York.

It was outfitted with a speedometer and a crude turn-and-bank indicator.

It was scheduled to fly in June, from a field east of Mineola, on the Hempstead Plains.

On February 3, 1914, Harper married Florence Tobin of Denver, Colorado in Newport, Rhode Island.

Writings

References

Members of the Early Birds of Aviation
Aviation pioneers
Year of birth missing
Year of death missing